Mauricio Lara Acosta (born 23 February 1998) is a Mexican professional boxer. He has held the WBA featherweight title since February 2023. As of October 2022, Lara is ranked as the world's best active featherweight by the Transnational Boxing Rankings Board, fourth by The Ring, and first by BoxRec.

Professional career

Lara vs. Warrington
In his toughest test to date, Lara faced undefeated former IBF featherweight champion Josh Warrington on 13 February 2021 at the SSE Arena in London. No title was on the line as Warrington had vacated his IBF featherweight title a month prior.

Warrington had started off the fight slower than usual, and in the fourth round, Lara hurt him with a left hook before knocking his opponent down. Despite getting up, Warrington never regained his legs, though he was able to land a few effective combinations on Lara in the subsequent rounds. In the ninth round, Lara once again knocked his opponent down with a left hook, and the fight was immediately called off by the referee, handing Warrington his first career loss, breaking Warrington's 30-0 unbeaten streak. Lara's victory was considered a major upset, as he had been rated as an 11/1 (+1100) pre-fight underdog, compared to Warrington having been rated as the 1/33 (-3300) betting favorite. The Ring magazine opined that the result was an early candidate for its Upset of the Year award.

Lara vs. Warrington II 
It was announced on 14 July 2021 that Lara and Warrington would face each other in a rematch on 4 September at Headingley Stadium in Warrington's hometown of Leeds, England. Lara expressed excitement about the prospect of potentially handing Warrington another defeat, saying, “I’ve never been much of a talker, I’d rather do my talking in the ring. I’m going for a repeat performance on September 4. Hit once, hit twice. Warrington should know that I am coming for him. This is all about pride. This is for Mexico!” The fight ended in a technical draw after 2 rounds, after Lara was badly cut above his left eye due to a head clash.

Lara vs. Wood

On 24 August 2022 was announced that Leigh Wood would make his second WBA (Regular) title defence against Lara. The title bout was expected to headline a DAZN broadcast card, which would have taken place at the Motorpoint Arena Nottingham in Nottingham, England on 24 September 2022. However Leigh Wood withdrew from the fight ten days before it was supposed to take place, due to a torn biceps suffered in sparring.

Lara was once again booked for WBA featherweight title fight against Leigh Wood.  The fight took place on 18 February 2023. Mauricio Lara knocked down the champion with a left hook near the end of the seventh round, and Wood's trainer decided to throw in the towel. Lara became WBA (Regular) featherweight champion.

Professional boxing record

See also
List of Mexican boxing world champions
List of world featherweight boxing champions

References

External links

1998 births
Living people
Mexican male boxers
Boxers from Mexico City
Featherweight boxers
World featherweight boxing champions
World Boxing Association champions